In Greek mythology, Boeotus was the eponym of Boeotia in Greece. Poseidon fathered both Aeolus and Boeotus with Arne (Melanippe). It was then through Boeotus that Arne became the ancestress of the Boeotians. In some traditions, Boeotus is the father of Ogyges.

Mythology 
A late source tells the story of Boeotus' marriage to Eurythemista. Boeotus was planning to get married and had difficulty choosing between two candidates, both equally noble maidens (one of them was Eurythemista and the other one's name is not given). He arranged to meet both on top of a nameless mountain; when they came, he saw a star fall on Eurythemista's shoulder and immediately vanish, and chose her. The mountain was named Asterion (from astēr, "star") to commemorate the event, but was later renamed Cithaeron in honor of the young Cithaeron who was loved by Tisiphone, one of the Erinyes, and killed by her for not answering her feelings, the same source relates.

Notes

References 
 Diodorus Siculus, The Library of History translated by Charles Henry Oldfather. Twelve volumes. Loeb Classical Library. Cambridge, Massachusetts: Harvard University Press; London: William Heinemann, Ltd. 1989. Vol. 3. Books 4.59–8. Online version at Bill Thayer's Web Site
 Diodorus Siculus, Bibliotheca Historica. Vol 1-2. Immanel Bekker. Ludwig Dindorf. Friedrich Vogel. in aedibus B. G. Teubneri. Leipzig. 1888–1890. Greek text available at the Perseus Digital Library.
 Gaius Julius Hyginus, Fabulae from The Myths of Hyginus translated and edited by Mary Grant. University of Kansas Publications in Humanistic Studies. Online version at the Topos Text Project.
Hornblower, Simon, Lykophron, Alexandra: Greek Text, Translation, Commentary, and Introduction. Oxford University Press. Great Clarendon Street, Oxford, OX2 6DP, United Kingdom. 2015. 
 Lucius Mestrius Plutarchus, Morals translated from the Greek by several hands. Corrected and revised by. William W. Goodwin, PH. D. Boston. Little, Brown, and Company. Cambridge. Press Of John Wilson and son. 1874. 5. Online version at the Perseus Digital Library.
Pausanias, Description of Greece with an English Translation by W.H.S. Jones, Litt.D., and H.A. Ormerod, M.A., in 4 Volumes. Cambridge, MA, Harvard University Press; London, William Heinemann Ltd. 1918. . Online version at the Perseus Digital Library
Pausanias, Graeciae Descriptio. 3 vols. Leipzig, Teubner. 1903.  Greek text available at the Perseus Digital Library.
 Pseudo-Plutarch, De fluviis, in Plutarch's morals, Volume V, edited and translated by William Watson Goodwin, Boston: Little, Brown & Co., 1874. Online version at the Perseus Digital Library.

Children of Poseidon
Demigods in classical mythology
Boeotian characters in Greek mythology